Pereira da Silva is a Portuguese surname, which may come from the fusion of paternal and maternal names.

Notable people with the name include:

Pereira da Silva
Manuel Pereira da Silva (1920–2003), Portuguese sculptor
Footballers
Adriano Pereira da Silva (born 1982), Brazilian footballer
Carlos Roberto Pereira da Silva (born 1946), Brazilian football coach
Danilo Pereira da Silva (born 1989), Brazilian footballer
Elpídio Pereira da Silva Filho (born 1975), Brazilian footballer
Emerson Pereira da Silva (born 1973), Brazilian footballer
Everson Pereira da Silva (born 1975), Brazilian footballer
Fábio Pereira da Silva (born 1990), Brazilian footballer
Odacir Pereira da Silva ("Itaqui", born 1988), Brazilian footballer
Luciano José Pereira da Silva (born 1980), Brazilian footballer
Lucenilde Pereira da Silva ("Lúcio", born 1975), Brazilian footballer
Márcio Pereira da Silva (born 1984), Brazilian footballer
Michael Anderson Pereira da Silva (born 1983), Brazilian footballer
Rafael Pereira da Silva (born 1980), Brazilian footballer
Rafael Pereira da Silva ("Rafael", born 1990), Brazilian footballer
Ueslei Raimundo Pereira da Silva (born 1972), Brazilian footballer
Wéverton Pereira da Silva (born 1987), Brazilian footballer

Silva Pereira
Francisco Xavier da Silva Pereira, Conde das Antas (1793–1852), Portuguese soldier
Jhonatan da Silva Pereira (born 1989), Brazilian footballer
João Pedro da Silva Pereira (born 1984), Portuguese footballer

Portuguese-language surnames
Portuguese families